McKittrick is a unincorporated community in Kern County, California, United States. The population was 115 at the 2010 census, down from 160 at the 2000 census.For statistical purposes, the United States Census Bureau has defined McKittrick as a census-designated place (CDP).

Geography
McKittrick is located at the junction of State Routes 33 and 58.

The town is in the center of a large oil-producing region in western Kern County.  Along State Route 33 to the south of the town is the Midway-Sunset Oil Field, the second-largest oil field in the contiguous United States; within the town itself, as well as to the west is the McKittrick Field; to the northwest is the huge Cymric Field; and along Highway 33 beyond Cymric is the large South Belridge Oil Field, run by Aera Energy LLC.  East of McKittrick is Occidental Petroleum's Elk Hills Field, formerly the U.S. Naval Petroleum Reserve.

The McKittrick Tar Pits, which are similar to the more famous La Brea Tar Pits in Los Angeles, contain an assemblage of bones of ice age mammals.  They are a series of surface seeps from the underlying McKittrick Oil Field.

History
The first post office at McKittrick opened in 1910. The name honors Capt. William McKittrick, local landowner and rancher. McKittrick incorporated in 1911.

Berry Petroleum Company began sending out a property purchase offer letters of intent to homeowners in 2022 citing a new setback law that holds companies responsible for ensuring pollution from their operations does not negatively impact the health of nearby communities.

Demographics

2010
At the 2010 census McKittrick had a population of 115. The racial makeup of McKittrick was 101 (87.8%) White, 1 (0.9%) African American, 1 (0.9%) Native American, 0 (0.0%) Asian, 0 (0.0%) Pacific Islander, 7 (6.1%) from other races, and 5 (4.3%) from two or more races. Hispanic or Latino of any race were 9 people (7.8%).

The whole population lived in households, no one lived in non-institutionalized group quarters and no one was institutionalized.

There were 42 households, 14 (33.3%) had children under the age of 18 living in them, 21 (50.0%) were opposite-sex married couples living together, 7 (16.7%) had a female householder with no husband present, 2 (4.8%) had a male householder with no wife present.  There were 5 (11.9%) unmarried opposite-sex partnerships, and 0 (0%) same-sex married couples or partnerships. 9 households (21.4%) were one person and 3 (7.1%) had someone living alone who was 65 or older. The average household size was 2.74.  There were 30 families (71.4% of households); the average family size was 3.07.

The age distribution was 21 people (18.3%) under the age of 18, 11 people (9.6%) aged 18 to 24, 24 people (20.9%) aged 25 to 44, 45 people (39.1%) aged 45 to 64, and 14 people (12.2%) who were 65 or older.  The median age was 45.4 years. For every 100 females, there were 101.8 males.  For every 100 females age 18 and over, there were 91.8 males.

There were 46 housing units at an average density of 17.6 per square mile, of the occupied units 27 (64.3%) were owner-occupied and 15 (35.7%) were rented. The homeowner vacancy rate was 0%; the rental vacancy rate was 6.3%.  80 people (69.6% of the population) lived in owner-occupied housing units and 35 people (30.4%) lived in rental housing units.

2000
At the 2000 census, there were 160 people, 54 households and 48 families living in the CDP. There were 61 housing units at an average density of 24.3 per square mile (9.4/km). The racial makeup of the CDP was 96.88% White, and 3.12% from two or more races. 10.00% of the population are Hispanic or Latino of any race.

Of the 54 households 42.6% had children under the age of 18 living with them, 59.3% were married couples living together, 27.8% had a female householder with no husband present, and 11.1% were non-families. 9.3% of households were one person and none had someone living alone who was 65 or older. The average household size was 2.96 and the average family size was 3.04.

Age distribution was 31.9% under the age of 18, 9.4% from 18 to 24, 30.0% from 25 to 44, 21.9% from 45 to 64, and 6.9% 65 or older. The median age was 34 years. For every 100 females, there were 102.5 males. For every 100 females age 18 and over, there were 98.2 males.

The median household income was $43,333, and the median family income was $42,917. Males had a median income of $30,625 versus $28,750 for females. The per capita income for the CDP was $14,174. About 11.8% of families and 15.0% of the population were below the poverty line, including 21.2% of those under the age of eighteen and none of those sixty five or over.

References

Photographs

Census-designated places in Kern County, California
Census-designated places in California
1910 establishments in California